Comte Médéric de Vasselot de Régné (4 August 1837 – 23 April 1919) was a French-born forest officer trained at the National School of Forestry in Nancy, France, and appointed as Superintendent of Woods and Forests in South Africa in 1880. Médéric and his elder brother Marin Gabriel were sons of Jean Gabriel Charles Auguste de Vasselot de Régné (1780–1842) and Eugénie Gabrielle Elisabeth Selima Vasselot de la Chesnaye (1807–1879).

Since the earliest days of European settlement at the Cape, the indigenous forests of the southern Cape were used as a seemingly inexhaustible source of timber and fuel. From 1652 when Jan van Riebeeck landed at the Cape until the 1880s, the forests and the fauna they supported were despoiled in the same way as those of the United States and Australia, with little or no thought given to sustainability. About 1776 a woodcutting centre was established at George, a step which heralded a century of plundering of the surrounding forests. An improved road between Swellendam and George saw an ever-increasing number of settlers and adventurers eager to participate in the timber boom. The perception was that of an unlimited resource, leading to excessively wasteful practices where only the choicest grades and sizes of timber were removed, and the majority of cut trees were simply left to rot.

In 1778, the Governor Joachim van Plettenberg inspected the region and was appalled at the destruction. As a result, Johann Fredrick Meeding was appointed Resident at Plettenberg Bay in an effort to instil some form of control over the cutting. Meeding diligently performed his duties and his post survived a number of successive changes of government which followed British occupation of the Cape in 1795. Even so, no new conservation measures were introduced, and when Graaff-Reinet was founded in 1786 the timber boom resumed with wholesale cutting of the forests between George and Knysna, the official founding of George in 1811 aggravating the destruction. A further burden on the forests was the Royal Navy's extraction of timber to meet the needs of the dockyard at Simonstown, a situation which lasted until 1825 when iron saw an increasing use in boat-building. The withdrawal of the Navy's workers led to an immediate occupation of the vacated areas by new woodcutters. The start of the Great Trek in 1836 caused new waves of cutters from the Langkloof to invade the forests of the Tsitsikamma in the Humansdorp area. To make matters worse the Government decided in 1846 to sell the worked-out forests as agricultural lots. Of the remaining forest only a narrow strip stretching between the Keurbooms and Kaaimans Rivers were under State control and the local magistrate issued felling permits to woodcutters in an attempt to gather as much revenue as possible. By 1847 the situation had become so critical that all Crown Forests were declared closed. A Conservator of Forests was appointed assisted by 4 rangers. This protection was short-lived and in 1856 the forests were re-opened.

The second Conservator of Forests was appointed at this time and was a retired Army officer, Captain Christopher Harison, a man with no forestry training, but with remarkable aptitude for his new career. He made himself familiar with European silviculture and adopted the practice of exploiting the forests in sections which led to better control and greatly reduced waste. He was also an outspoken critic of Crown Forest alienation and it was largely due to his efforts that this practice was stopped. The Colonial Botanist, Karl Wilhelm Ludwig Pappe, issued dire warnings about the extent of destruction and became another voice supporting the growing conservation mood. The appointment of Captain Baron de Fin as Conservator of Forests at Keiskammahoek followed in 1865. Despite the warnings, matters carried on in much the same way until the great forest fire of February 1869 in which large parts of the forest between George and the Bloukrans River were completely destroyed. The matter was raised in Parliament and a commission consisting of Captain Harison and Thomas Bain was appointed. Following this Captain Harison was appointed as Conservator of Forests for the Knysna region in 1874. His work was bedevilled by the timber needs of the railway line to Kimberley and the short-lived gold rush at Millwood in 1876.

De Vasselot's appointment as Superintendent of Woods and Forests followed in 1880. This was the first time that a professional forester had been put in charge and was a turning point in South African forestry. For the first time the authorities were persuaded that a sound silvicultural policy was of greater importance than the revenue derived from exploitation. The details of the new management system were spelled out in the Forest Regulation of 1883. When de Vasselot left the Cape in 1891, the forests of George, Knysna and the Tsitsikamma were being managed on a scientific basis. Two important publications by de Vasselot in 1885 were an "Introduction to the Systematic Treatment of the Crown Forests of the Cape Colony" and a pamphlet on "Selection and Seasoning of Wood", both translated into English by the then Conservator of Transkeian Forests, A. W. Heywood. In 1898 Heywood was succeeded by Colin MacNaughton as Conservator at Knysna, where he marked out the first permanent sample plots in the forests to study indigenous tree communities, laying a valuable foundation for research into forest ecosystems.  McNaughton strongly believed that the ‘forests must be worked in the interests of the country, and not in the interests of the immediate population’. That is, trees should be considered a national resource, and not relevant to the livelihood of communities who exploited the forest.

De Vasselot is commemorated in the de Vasselot Nature Reserve surrounding Nature's Valley.

Marriage and family
Médéric belonged to the Vasselot family, an old French noble family with origins dating back to the 14th century.
Médéric was married on 5 October 1863 to Louise Suzanne Robinet de Plas (1844–1922), the daughter of Louis Augustin Ludovic Robinet de Plas (1813–1899) & Louise Marie Claire Picher (1824–1893).

Children
(daughter) Mary de Vasselot de Régné 1865–1940 married to Raymond Frotier de la Coste-Messelière
(son) Maurice de Vasselot de Régné 1866–1868
(daughter) Francoise Marie Paule 1867–1900, a Catholic sister at the Sacré Coeur
(daughter) Jeanne Marie de Vasselot de Régné 1869–1956 married to Pierre de Goy, voir Légion d'Honneur (Officier) 1860–1928
(son) Médéric de Vasselot de Régné 1871–1872
(daughter) Bernadette de Vasselot de Régné 1872-1872
(daughter) Marie-Elisabeth 1874–1940, a Catholic sister
(son) Médéric de Vasselot de Régné, voir Légion d'Honneur (Officier) 1875–1954 married 3 December 1906 to Marie Joséphine Germaine de Baudus 1885–1920
(son) Bernard de Vasselot de Régné 1877–1891
(son) Hilaire de Vasselot de Régné 1878–1913, a pilot with the French armed forces, he died in an airship accident
(daughter) Marie Bernadette Radegonde de Vasselot de Régné 1879–1934 married in 1907 to Louis du Breuil Hélion de la Guéronnière 1876–1936
(daughter) Marie Thérèse Colomban Dolly de Vasselot de Régné 1882–1951 married 2 June 1915 to Marcel Roland-Gosselin 1864–1944
(daughter) Yvonne Marie de Vasselot de Régné 1884–1975
(son) Augustin Louis de Vasselot de Régné 1886–1911
(son) Jean Marie Maurice de Vasselot de Régné, Voir Mort pour la France 1888–1940 married to Jeanne-Marie Libault de la Chevasnerie

References

1837 births
1919 deaths
South African foresters
History of forestry